Bani Ebid Stadium, is a multi-use stadium in Bani Ebeid, Egypt.  It is used mostly for football matches and it also has an athletics track.  The stadium holds 30,000.  

Football venues in Egypt